Festa della Repubblica (English: Republic Day) is the Italian National Day and Republic Day, which is celebrated on 2 June each year, with the main celebration taking place in Rome. The Festa della Repubblica is one of the national symbols of Italy.

The day commemorates the institutional referendum held by universal suffrage in 1946, in which the Italian people were called to the polls to decide on the form of government following the Second World War and the fall of Fascism.

The ceremony of the event, organized in Rome, includes the deposition of a laurel wreath as a tribute to the Italian Unknown Soldier at the Altare della Patria by the President of the Italian Republic and a military parade along Via dei Fori Imperiali in Rome.

History

On 2 and 3 June 1946, an institutional referendum was held with which the Italians were called to the polls to decide which form of state – monarchy or republic – to give to the country. The referendum was announced at the end of World War II, a few years after the fall of the Fascist regime in Italy, the dictatorial regime that had been supported by the Italian royal family, the House of Savoy, for more than 20 years.

The supporters of the republic chose the symbol of the Italia turrita, the national personification of Italy, to be used in the electoral campaign and on the referendum card on the institutional form of the State, in contrast to the Savoy coat of arms which represented the monarchy. This triggered various controversies, given that the iconography of the allegorical personification of Italy had, and still has, a universal and unifying meaning that should have been common to all Italians and not only to a part of them: this was the last appearance in the institutional context of turreted Italy.

This institutional referendum was the first vote by universal suffrage in Italy. The result of the popular consultation, 12,717,923 votes for the republic and 10,719,284 for the monarchy (with a percentage, respectively, of 54.3% and 45.7%), was communicated on 10 June 1946, when the Court of Cassation declared, after 85 years of the Kingdom of Italy, the birth of the Italian Republic, being definitively sanctioned on 18 June.

The King of Italy, Umberto II of Savoy, decided to leave Italy on 13 June to avoid the clashes between monarchists and Republicans, already manifested in bloody events in various Italian cities, for fear they could extend throughout the country. He went into exile in Portugal. From 1 January 1948, with the entry into force of the Constitution of the Italian Republic, the male descendants of Umberto II of Savoy were banned from entering Italy; the provision being repealed in 2002. 11 June 1946, the first day of republican Italy, was declared a public holiday.

On 2 June the birth of the modern nation is celebrated in a similar way to the French 14 July (anniversary of the storming of the Bastille) and to the 4th July in the United States (anniversary of the declaration of independence from Great Britain). The unity of Italy and the birth of the Italian state is celebrated on 17 March, in honor of 17 March 1861, the date of the proclamation of the Kingdom of Italy. Before the birth of the republic, the national celebratory day of the Kingdom of Italy was the feast of the Statuto Albertino, which was held on the first Sunday of June.

The first celebration of the Festa della Repubblica took place on 2 June 1947, while in 1948 there was the first parade in Via dei Fori Imperiali in Rome; 2 June was definitively declared a national holiday in 1949. On this occasion the ceremonial included the past review of the armed forces in honor of the republic by the President of the Italian Republic; the demonstration took place in Piazza Venezia, opposite the Altare della Patria. After the deposition of the laurel crown to the Italian Unknown Soldier by the President of the Italian Republic Luigi Einaudi, the banners of the armed forces abandoned the formation, they walked the stairway of the monument and paid homage to the president with a bow.

In 1949, with the entry of Italy into NATO, ten celebrations took place simultaneously throughout the country: on the occasion, to highlight the bond of the newly formed republic with Mazzinianism, current of the Risorgimento which was headed by Giuseppe Mazzini, fervent Republican, a celebratory monument was inaugurated in the current Piazzale Ugo La Malfa in Rome, in memory of the Genoese patriot, in front of which the main event of the Festa della Repubblica took place.

In 1961 the main celebration of the Festa della Repubblica did not take place in Rome but in Turin, the first capital of a united Italy. Turin was the capital of Italy from 1861 to 1865, followed by Florence (1865–1871) and finally by Rome, which is its capital since 1871. In 1961, in fact, was also celebrated the centenary of the unification of Italy (1861–1961). In 1963 the demonstration was not carried out on 2 June for the health conditions of Pope John XXIII, now dying, and was postponed to 4 November, simultaneously with National Unity and Armed Forces Day.

In 1965 the banners of the suppressed military units that took part in the World War I also participated in the main celebration of Rome; in that year the 50th anniversary of Italy's entry into the First World War was also commemorated. Specifically, Italy officially began military operations in World War I on 24 May 1915, with a first cannon shot fired by Fort Verena, on the Asiago plateau, towards the Austrian fortresses located on the Vezzena Plain: to the first infantry of the Royal Italian Army that crossed the border is dedicated the first stanza of La Leggenda del Piave.

Due to the severe economic crisis that gripped Italy in the 1970s, to contain state and social costs, the Festa della Repubblica, with law n. 54 of 5 March 1977, was moved to the first Sunday of June, with the consequent suppression of 2 June as a public holiday connected to it. In 2001, on the impulse of the then President of the Republic, Carlo Azeglio Ciampi, who was the protagonist, at the beginning of the 21st century, of a more general action to promote national symbols of Italy, the Festa della Repubblica has abandoned the status of a moveable feast, summarizing its traditional location of 2 June, which has now returned to being a holiday in all respects.

Celebration

The official ceremony of the Rome celebration includes the solemn flag-raising ceremony at the Altare della Patria and the tribute to the Italian Unknown Soldier with the deposition of a laurel wreath by the President of the Italian Republic in the presence of the most important officers of the State, or of the President of the Senate, the President of the Chamber of Deputies, the President of the Council of Ministers, the President of the Constitutional Court, the Minister of Defense and the Chief of Defense. After the playing of the National Anthem Il Canto degli Italiani, the Frecce Tricolori cross the skies of Rome.

Following the ceremony the President is then driven to Via di San Gregorio with the presidential Lancia Flaminia escorted by a patrol group of Corazzieri on a motorcycle where, together with the military commander of the capital garrison, usually a Major General, he reviews the parade formations presenting arms as the bands play their service or inspection marches. The Head of State then processes to the presidential tribune which is located in Via dei Fori Imperiali, gets down the vehicle, and processes there to meet other dignitaries and as he arrives in his spot in the dais the Corazzieri's mounted troopers, which had provided the rear escort during the review phrase, salute the President as the anthem is played.It is tradition, for the members of the Italian government and for the presidents of the two chambers of parliament, to have pinned on the jacket, during the whole ceremony, an Italian tricolor cockade. Following the anthem, the parade begins, which the ground columns of military personnel saluting the President with eyes left or right with their colours dipped as they march past the dais. Mobile column crew contingent colour guards perform the salute in like manner.

The ceremony concludes in the afternoon with the opening to the public of the gardens of the Quirinal Palace, seat of the Presidency of the Italian Republic, and with musical performances by the bands of the Italian Army, the Italian Navy, and the Italian Air Force, of the Carabinieri, of the Polizia di Stato, of the Guardia di Finanza, of the Polizia Penitenziaria and of the State Forestry Corps.

On the feast day, at the Palazzo del Quirinale, the Changing of the Guard with the Corazzieri Regiment and the Fanfare of the Carabinieri Cavalry Regiment in high uniform is carried out in solemn form. This solemn rite is only performed on two other occasions, during the celebrations of the Tricolour Day (7 January) and the National Unity and Armed Forces Day (4 November).

Official ceremonies are held throughout the national territory. Among them are the traditional receptions organized by each prefecture for the local authorities, which are preceded by solemn public demonstrations with reduced military parades that have been reviewed by the prefect in his capacity as the highest governmental authority in the province. Similar ceremonies are also organized by the Regions and Municipalities.

All over the world, Italian embassies organize ceremonies to which the Heads of State of the host country are invited. Greetings from the other Heads of State reach the President of the Italian Republic from all over the world.

Parade

The Italian Armed Forces, all the police forces of the Republic, the Vigili del Fuoco, the Protezione Civile and the Italian Red Cross take part in the military parade. The military parade was included for the first time in the protocol of official celebrations in 1950.

In 1976 the military parade was not organized following the disastrous earthquake of Friuli, while the following year, in 1977, in full austerity, it was decided not to resume the traditional military parade to avoid burdening further expenses on the state budget. This decision was also reiterated in the following years. Instead of the military parade, a demonstration was organized in Piazza Venezia, which was attended by representatives of the Italian armed forces.

The military parade was reinserted in the official ceremony of the main celebration of Rome in 1983; in that year the Festa della Repubblica was organized on the first Sunday of June, which was the 5th, between the Aventine and Porta San Paolo to commemorate the Resistance to the German occupation of the city of Rome during the World War II. The following year, in 1984, the parade returned to Via dei Fori Imperiali, while in 1985 it took place between Via dei Cerchi and the Baths of Caracalla. In 1989 the military parade was eliminated again; in its place a historical exhibition was organized in Piazza di Siena in Rome. Until 1999, the celebration of the Festa della Repubblica was limited exclusively to the ceremony at the Altare della Patria.

The parade returned permanently to the ceremony in 2000 on the initiative of the then President of the Republic Carlo Azeglio Ciampi. In 2004, Carlo Azeglio Ciampi granted a special privillege to the municipal police corps of Rome, representing all the local Italian police, and the Protezione Civile personnel to take part in the parade in honor of their services to the country and their communities.

The military parade also includes some military delegations from the United Nations, NATO, the European Union and representatives of multinational departments with an Italian component. One of the most awaited parts of the celebrations, the parade is saluted by the President in his or her capacity as Commander in Chief of the Armed Forces.

Brief summary of the parade segment 
As earlier stated the parade begins with the playing of the National Anthem as troopers of the Corazzieri salute the President. After the troopers march off the grandstand, the parade begins as the Central National Band of the Carabinieri marches past the dais, the first band of the parade, to herald the official arrival of the parade commander, usually a Major General of the Army, who drives past the grandstand with his motorized escort, followed by a motorized colour guard. Veterans contingents in vehicles from the Armed Forces, all police forces and the Vigili del Fuoco follow the command contingent.

These personnel are followed by the ground contingent, made up of personnel of the Armed Forces, all police forces, Civil Protection and civil service personnel. These march past the dais in a strict order of precedence with the military contingents marching past first followed by the police and civil contingents.

See also

 1946 Italian institutional referendum
 National symbols of Italy
 Republic Day
 Public holidays in Italy
 Anniversary of the Unification of Italy
 Anniversary of the Liberation
 National Memorial Day of the Exiles and Foibe
 National Unity and Armed Forces Day
 Tricolour Day

Citations

References 

 

1946 establishments in Italy
Festivals in Italy
Public holidays in Italy
June observances
Articles containing video clips
Italy